Daily Sun is an English-language daily newspaper published in Dhaka, Bangladesh, founded in 2010. It also operates an English news portal www.daily-sun.com and a Bangla news portal www.bangla.daily-sun.com apart from maintaining a website www.edailysun.com for the e-version of the published copies. The main paper has 24 pages including 4 pages on business and 2 pages on sports which is called "Winner". 'the daily sun' is owned by East West Media Group, a concern of Bashundhara Group.

Description
The Daily Sun is an English-language daily newspaper published in Dhaka, Bangladesh. Also it publishes bangla-language daily news. It was founded in 2010. The main paper has 28 pages including 4 pages on business and 8 pages on sports which is called "Winner".

When the paper criticised the shipping minister's role in granting licences and violation of traffic rules by drivers, transport workers raided and looted delivery vehicles.  A Daily Sun journalist based in New York, Santosh Mandal, died 2016 of a heart attack.
The Daily Sun is owned by East West Media Group, a part of Bashundhara group, along with Bangladesh Pratidin, Kaler Kantho, and online news portal Banglanews24.com. Professor Syed Anwar Hossain was the founder Editor of this newspaper.

Weekly supplements
Its weekly supplements include:
 Groove
 The Hood
 Morning Tea

See also
 List of newspapers in Bangladesh

References

External links
 
 Daily-sun Bangla Version (archived)

English-language newspapers published in Bangladesh
Newspapers published in Dhaka
Daily newspapers published in Bangladesh